The men's individual foil competition at the 2002 Asian Games in Busan was held on 29 September at the Gangseo Gymnasium.

Schedule
All times are Korea Standard Time (UTC+09:00)

Results

Preliminary pool

Knockout round

Final standing

References
2002 Asian Games Report, Page 402

External links
 Official website

Men foil